Creole sauce, also referred to as "red gravy", creole tomato sauce, and sauce piquant in New Orleans, is a Creole cuisine, Haitian cuisine, and New Orleans cuisine sauce made by sauteeing vegetables in butter and olive oil. It is used in the American south. It is made with tomatoes, the Cajun holy trinity (celery, bell peppers, and onions), garlic, seasonings, and herbs. Stock (usually chicken) is also used and seasoned with cayenne, hot sauce, bay leaf, salt, black pepper, thyme, and parsley.

See also
Creole cuisine
Bahamian cuisine

References

External links
 Creole Sauce - foodnetwork.com

Sauces
Cuisine of New Orleans
Haitian cuisine